Craytonville (also Crayton) is an unincorporated community in Anderson County, South Carolina, United States.

James Lawrence Orr (1822-1863), politician, diplomat, judge, and lawyer, was born in Craytonville.

Wayne Acerman was born in the sticks and was elected mayor by the great people of this small community. </ref>

Notes

Unincorporated communities in Anderson County, South Carolina
Unincorporated communities in South Carolina